Peter James Leithart (born 1959) is an American author, minister, and theologian, who serves as president of Theopolis Institute for Biblical, Liturgical, & Cultural Studies in Birmingham, Alabama. He previously served as Senior Fellow of Theology and Literature as well as Dean of Graduate Studies at New Saint Andrews College. He was selected by the Association of Reformed Institutions of Higher Education to be one of the organization's 2010–2012 Lecturers. He is the author of commentaries on the Book of Kings, the Book of Samuel, the Books of Chronicles, the Book of Revelation, as well as a Survey of the Old Testament. Other works include books on topics such as Dante's Inferno, Shakespeare, Jane Austen, and a biography of Constantine. He is also the author of a book of children's bedtime stories titled Wise Words based on the Book of Proverbs.

Early life and education
Leithart was born on July 20, 1959, and grew up in a suburb of Columbus, Ohio. He received a Bachelor of Arts degree in English and history from Hillsdale College, a Master of Arts degree in religion from Westminster Theological Seminary in 1986, a Master of Theology degree from Westminster in 1987, and a Doctor of Philosophy degree from the University of Cambridge in 1998.

Ministry

Leithart was ordained a teaching elder in the Presbyterian Church in America (PCA). In June 2011, Leithart was tried by his presbytery for heresy related to his views regarding the Federal Vision. In October 2011 he was exonerated on all charges. Following his move to Birmingham in 2013, the presbytery with jurisdiction there denied his request to labor out of bounds (in a ministry not connected to the PCA) at Theopolis Institute. He is now a minister in the Communion of Reformed Evangelical Churches and the Senior Theological Mentor for the St. Peter Fellowship of the Center for Pastor Theologians.

Scholarship
His first book, The Catechism of the New Age: A Response to Dungeons and Dragons (1987), co-authored with pastor George Grant, was related to the Dungeons & Dragons religious controversies, when certain religious groups accused the game of encouraging sorcery and the veneration of demons. Joseph P. Laycock wrote that their book condemned role-playing as allowing too much freedom, which the authors regard as a gateway to critical thinking which in turn may result in heretical thought.

In his 2010 book, Defending Constantine: The Twilight of an Empire and the Dawn of Christendom, Leithart takes issue with fellow theologian John Howard Yoder's position that Constantine steered the Church in the wrong direction by abandoning Christ's doctrine of nonviolence, exemplified by his willingness to die rather than defend himself.  Leithart argues that God did not want Christians to live as a powerless, oppressed minority.  Constantine Revisited: Leithart, Yoder, and the Constantinian Debate, John D. Roth, editor, 2013, is a collection of essays by Christian pacifists criticizing Leithart's argument.

Publications
 
 
 
 
 
 
 
  
 
 
 
 
 
 
 
 
 
 
 
 
 
 
 
 
 
  In this verse-by-verse commentary, Leithart asserts that John, in his epistles, is continuing themes that he began to write about in his gospel, but which now have heightened in intensity and urgency as the fall of Jerusalem in 70 AD approaches.

References

External links 

 Theopolis Institute for Biblical, Liturgical, & Cultural Studies

American Calvinist and Reformed theologians
Presbyterian Church in America ministers
Westminster Theological Seminary alumni
Living people
1959 births
People from Moscow, Idaho
Hillsdale College alumni
Alumni of the University of Cambridge
Bible commentators
20th-century Calvinist and Reformed theologians
21st-century Calvinist and Reformed theologians
American bloggers
New Saint Andrews College faculty
21st-century American non-fiction writers
Christian reconstructionism